Jye Amiss (born 31 July 2003) is an Australian rules footballer who plays for the Fremantle Football Club in the Australian Football League (AFL).

Career 
Amiss was drafted with Fremantle's first selection, the 8th overall, in the 2021 national draft.  He made his debut in round 6 of the 2022 AFL season against  kicking two goals on debut, including a goal with his first kick. Amiss suffered a kidney injury while playing for Peel Thunder in the WAFL, and had to undergo surgery which saw him side lined for 12 weeks. Amiss made his AFL return during Fremantle's elimination final against the Western Bulldogs at Optus Stadium, kicking two goals.

Statistics
Updated to the end of Semi-finals, 2022.

|-
| 2022
|  || 24 || 3 || 4 || 1 || 21 || 7 || 28 || 13 || 2 || 1.3 || 0.3 || 7 || 2.3 || 9.3 || 4.3 || 0.6
|- class="sortbottom" 
! colspan=3| Career
! 3
! 4
! 1
! 21
! 7
! 28
! 13
! 2
! 1.3
! 0.3
! 7
! 2.3
! 9.3
! 4.3
! 0.6
|}

References

External links 

2003 births
Living people
People from Busselton